Don Richman (1931 — 8 November 1986) was an American sports executive. Richman initially worked in public relations and came up with the name of the Los Angeles Chargers in 1960. After the Seattle SuperSonics were formed, Richman was their general manager from 1967 to 1968. He later worked with the SuperSonics as a consultant.

Outside of sports, Richman worked as a television script writer during the 1960s. Some of the shows he worked on included The Farmer's Daughter and The Rat Patrol. In the late 1960s, Richman was half of a singing duo called The Brother Sincere alongside Mal Sharpe. While working in advertising with Chuck Blore, Richman won multiple Clio Awards in 1983.

Early life and education
Richman was born in 1931 and spent his childhood in Hartford, Connecticut. For his post-secondary education, he went to Vanderbilt University and the University of Southern California. While he was at USC, Richman was a sports information director from 1956 to 1959.

Career
After graduating from USC, Richman created a public relations company with Al Davis in 1960. During his PR career, he came up with the name of the Los Angeles Chargers when the team was established. Richman decided to name the Chargers after team owner Barron Hilton's credit card company Carte Blanche. The following year, Richman left the Chargers in 1961 to work in television. As a script writer, he wrote for various television shows including The Farmer's Daughter, The Donna Reed Show and The Rat Patrol during the 1960s.

In January 1967, Richman became the first general manager of the newly formed National Basketball Association team Seattle SuperSonics. Richman stepped down as the SuperSonics general manager in May 1968 and was replaced by Dick Vertlieb. He continued working with the basketball team as a consultant after leaving his executive position. After leaving the SuperSonics, Richman moved from sports to join a Los Angeles advertising company owned by Chuck Blore. Richman had worked with Blore's company earlier in his career when he was a screenwriter during the early 1960s. Outside of radio, Richman sang with television writer Mal Sharpe as one half of The Brothers Sincere in the late 1960s.

Awards
In 1983, Richman and Blore won multiple Clio Awards in radio advertising for multiple companies including Roy Rogers Restaurants and AT&T.

Death
On 8 November 1986, Richman died in Los Angeles.

References

1931 births
1986 deaths
American public relations people
Screenwriters from Connecticut
Seattle SuperSonics general managers
Clio Award winners
20th-century American screenwriters
Date of birth missing